The Golden Maple Awards are annual awards presented by the Academy of Canadians in Sports and Entertainment – Los Angeles (ACISE-LA) to Canadian actors performing in television shows broadcast in the United States. The ACISE-LA is non-profit org, with members consisting of acting and directing talent, Canadian Olympians, and Canadian athletes who play for established sports franchises.  The first awards ceremony was held on July 1, 2015.

2015 Awards
References: Winners highlighted in bold

Best Actor in a TV Series Broadcast in the U.S.
Brandon Jay McLaren – Graceland
Adam Copeland – Haven
Alexander Ludwig – Vikings
Greyston Holt – Bitten
Jonathan Keltz – Reign
Lyriq Bent – The Book of Negroes  
Torrance Coombs – Reign

Best Actress in a TV Series Broadcast in the U.S.
Amanda Crew – Silicon Valley
Anna Silk – Lost Girl
Caroline Dhavernas – Hannibal
Jessalyn Gilsig – Vikings
Katheryn Winnick – Vikings
Kathleen Robertson – Murder in the First
Missy Peregrym – Rookie Blue

Newcomer of the Year in a TV Series Broadcast in the U.S.
Emily Hampshire – 12 Monkeys and Schitt's Creek
Meaghan Rath – New Girl
Brooke Wexler – Richie Rich
Italia Ricci – Chasing Life
Shailyn Pierre-Dixon – The Book of Negroes

2016 Awards
References: Winners highlighted in bold

Best Actor in a TV Series Broadcast in the U.S.
Ricky Mabe – Gigi Does It
Ben Hollingsworth – Code Black
Brandon Jay McLaren – Graceland
Byron Mann –Hell on Wheels
Christopher Heyerdahl – Hell on Wheels
David Sutcliffe – Proof
Giacomo Gianniotti – Grey’s Anatomy
Jonathan Keltz – Reign

Best Actress in a TV Series Broadcast in the U.S.
Natalie Brown – The Strain
Amanda Crew – Silicon Valley
Britne Oldford – Hunters
Emily Hampshire – 12 Monkeys
Emily Hampshire – Schitt's Creek
Erin Karpluk – The Riftworld Chronicles
Laura Vandervoort – Bitten
Lindy Booth – The Librarians

Newcomer of the Year in a TV Series Broadcast in the U.S.
Amanda Crew – Silicon Valley
Ennis Esmer – Red Oaks
Christopher Heyerdahl – Hell on Wheels
Giacomo Gianniotti – Grey’s Anatomy
Gregory Smith – Rookie Blue

See also

 Canadian television awards

References

Canadian television awards
Awards established in 2015